Elbella lamprus is a species of skipper butterfly in the genus Elbella. It is found in most of South America.

Subspecies
Elbella lamprus lamprus (Paraguay, Brazil, Argentina: Misiones)
Elbella lamprus albociliata Mielke, 1995 (Brazil: Santa Catarina)

References

Hesperiidae
Butterflies described in 1874
Hesperiidae of South America
Taxa named by Carl Heinrich Hopffer